Alassane N'Diaye (born 14 June 1991) is a French professional footballer who plays as a forward for  club AC Ajaccio.

Career
N'Diaye began his playing career at Chamois Niortais. He made his senior debut for the club in the 0–1 defeat at Montluçon on 6 February 2010, coming on as an 85th-minute substitute for Pierre Jamin. N'Diaye was handed his first start by Niort manager Pascal Gastien in the Championnat National match against Cherbourg on 12 October 2011, and he scored the opening goal in a 2–1 victory. He went on to make 18 appearances in total during the 2011–12 season, scoring twice, as Niort went on to finish as runners-up in the Championnat National.

N'Diaye was not offered a new contract by Niort in the summer of 2012 and subsequently signed for CA Bastia ahead of the 2012–13 campaign. In his first season with the Corsican outfit, he scored 10 goals in 37 league appearances as the team won promotion to Ligue 2 with a third-placed finish in the Championnat National. N'Diaye was again a regular starter for CA Bastia during the 2013–14 season, playing 34 games in all competitions as the side finished bottom of Ligue 2 and were relegated back to the third tier after only one year. In the penultimate game of the campaign on 9 May 2014, he scored against his former club Niort in a 1–1 draw at the Stade René Gaillard.

In June 2014, N'Diaye moved to Arles-Avignon for the 2014–15 season. He made his debut for Arles as an injury-time substitute for Ziri Hammar in the 0–0 draw with Ajaccio on 1 August. Three days later he joined Championnat National side Strasbourg on loan until the end of the season.

On 31 January 2017, N'Diaye joined Al-Taawoun

Career statistics

References

External links
 
 

1991 births
Living people
Sportspeople from Limoges
French footballers
French sportspeople of Senegalese descent
Association football forwards
Ligue 2 players
Championnat National players
Championnat National 3 players
Chamois Niortais F.C. players
CA Bastia players
AC Arlésien players
RC Strasbourg Alsace players
Saudi Professional League players
Al-Taawoun FC players
Clermont Foot players
AC Ajaccio players
French expatriate footballers
Expatriate footballers in Saudi Arabia
French expatriate sportspeople in Saudi Arabia
Footballers from Nouvelle-Aquitaine